Ana Maria Pereira Abrunhosa Trigueiros de Aragão (born 4 July 1970) is a Portuguese economist and politician serving as Minister for Territorial Cohesion since October 2019.

She has a doctorate in economics from the Faculty of Economics of the University of Coimbra, and has taught several subjects there since 1995, such as microeconomics, regional economics, and European economics. She was also a researcher at the university's Centre for Social Studies.

Politically unaffiliated, she had held public offices dealing with regional development and innovation management under both António Costa's centre-left government (PS) and the preceding Pedro Passos Coelho centre-right government (PSD). Before becoming Minister, among other positions, she was President of the Centro Regional Coordination and Development Commission (2014–2019) — which, notably, coincided with the devastating June 2017 Portugal wildfires —, President of the management board of the Centro Regional Operational Programme (2014–2019), President of the Investment Committee of the Urban Instrument for Rehabilitation and Revitalisation (2016–2019), President of the General Council of the Debt & Guarantees Fund of the Financial Development Institution (2017–2018) and of the General Council of the Capital & Quasi-Capital Fund (2019), and President of the EuroACE Working Community and Euroregion (2018–2019).

She has expressed a wish to run for Mayor of Coimbra as an independent in the future.

Her second and current husband is António Trigueiros de Aragão, CEO of Fábricas Lusitana, a Portuguese food manufacturer, famous for the production of Branca de Neve flour. Her husband is a claimant to the title of 7th Count of Idanha-a-Nova.

References

1970 births
Living people
Government ministers of Portugal
Academic staff of the University of Coimbra
University of Coimbra alumni
Women government ministers of Portugal
21st-century Portuguese women politicians
21st-century Portuguese politicians
Independent politicians in Portugal